This is a list of Ice Road Truckers Season 4 episodes.
 
Season 4 of Ice Road Truckers premiered on June 6, 2010.

Returning drivers

Debogorski, Rowland, Jessee, Hall, and Kelly continue driving the Dalton Highway for Carlile this season. Debogorski had a good season, stopping to help drivers in trouble on multiple occasions. Rowland spent the season trying to avoid the Department of Transport (DOT) Weigh station. Jessee was assigned some of the toughest loads, to be taken over some of the roughest roads. Kelly started out the season with goals to achieve: she wanted to try hauling heavier, bigger loads and have a go at push-truck driving; she also aimed to save enough money to buy back her horse. Both goals she eventually achieved.

New drivers
Greg Boadwine: At 27, Boadwine is starting his second season with Carlile, after his first one ended early due to his overturning his truck. He is grateful that his employers have given him another chance; at the same time, he feels he has a long way to go in order to regain their full trust.
Ray Veilleux: Veilleux, 44, ran his own construction business in Kalispell, Montana until it failed as a result of the U.S. housing industry crash. He signed on with Carlile and has worked his way up from freight yard duty to making ice road runs.
Merv Gilbertson: Gilbertson is a second-generation haul road trucker, running Big State Logistics based out of Fairbanks. Except for one Carlile delivery by Jessee late in the season, Gilbertson and his convoys make all the supply runs to Bettles shown this season.

Route and destinations
Dalton Highway: The truckers make stops at Fairbanks, Coldfoot, Deadhorse and the oilfields of Prudhoe Bay as in Season 3, as well as the following new destinations:
Bettles, Alaska: Located near the center of Alaska along the remains of the Hickel Highway, this small town is accessible from the Dalton only by driving over frozen swampland.
Nuiqsut, Alaska: Located west of Deadhorse, Nuiqsut is accessible by an ice road connecting it to the Dalton Highway during the winter.

Some heavy haul loads bound for Prudhoe Bay originated in Anchorage and reached Fairbanks via the Glenn Highway and George Parks Highway before going on the Dalton.

Final load counts
 Veilleux – 19
 Rowland – 18
 Jessee – 17
 Kelly – 17
 Debogorski – 16
 Boadwine – 11

Episodes

References 

2010 American television seasons
Ice Road Truckers seasons